This is an incomplete list of Christian religious houses in Saxony in Germany, extant and non-extant, and including houses of both men and women. Most religious houses in Saxony were suppressed during the Reformation in the 16th century, but some survived. A small number also survived the Communist period of the DDR, including the Cistercian nunnery of St. Marienthal Abbey in Ostritz founded in 1243. Since the reunification of Germany in 1990, a number of new religious communities have been established.



List

A
Adorf: Teutonic Knights
Altzella Abbey (Kloster Altzella), Nossen: Cistercian monks (1170–1540)
Annaberg Friary (Franziskanerkloster Annaberg), Annaberg-Buchholz: Franciscan friars (1502–39)

B
Bautzen:
Franciscan friary, Grosse Brüdergasse
St. Peter's collegiate foundation, Bautzen (Stift St. Petri)
Buch Abbey (Kloster Buch), Klosterbuch in Leisnig: Cistercian monks (shortly before 1192–1525)

C
Chemnitz:
Schlossberg: Benedictines
Franciscan friary, Chemnitz

D
Döbeln Abbey (Kloster Döbeln), Döbeln: Benedictines
Dommitzsch Commandery, Dommitzsch: Teutonic Knights
Dörschnitz Abbey (Kloster Dörschnitz or Kloster Marienpforte), Dörschnitz: Benedictines
Dresden:
Sophienkirche, previously the Franziskanerkloster, Dresden
Augustinian priory, Dresden
Franciscan friary, Dresden

E
Antonine Hospital, Eicha

F
Frankenhausen Abbey, Frankenhausen in Crimmitschau: Cistercian nuns
Freiberg:
Dominican priory, Freiberg
Franciscan friary, Freiberg
Magdalenes' priory, Freiberg
St. Mary's collegiate foundation, Freiberg (St. Marienstift)

G
St. Mary's Abbey, Geringswalde (Kloster St Marien, Geringswalde), Geringswalde: Benedictines
Franciscan friary, Goerlitz (Klosterplatz)
Grimma:
Grimma Priory: Augustinian canons
Grimma Abbey: Cistercians
see also Nimbschen
Grossenhain:
Magdalenes' priory, Grossenhain
Servite priory, Grossenhain
collegiate foundation, Frohngässchen
Grünhain Abbey (Kloster Grünhain): Cistercian monks (1230–1536)
Güldenstern, see Marienstern

K
St. Anne's Priory, Kamenz: Franciscans
Kitzen Abbey, Kitzen: Cistercians
Königstein: Celestines

L
Leipzig:
Franciscan friary of the Holy Spirit, Leipzig (dates tbe)
St. George's Abbey, Leipzig (Kloster St. Georg, Leipzig): Cistercian nuns (before 1230–1541)
St. Paul's Priory, Leipzig: Dominicans (dates tbe)
St. Thomas' Abbey, Leipzig (Kloster St. Thomas, Leipzig): Augustinian Canons (1212–1541)
St. Albert's Priory, Wahren (Dominikanerkloster St. Albert, Wahren) (Wahren, Leipzig): Dominicans (from 1929)
St. John's church collegiate foundation, Löbau (Stift Johanniskirche, Löbau), Löbau: collegiate foundation

M
Marienpforte, see Dörschnitz and Sitzenroda
St. Marienstern Abbey (Kloster St. Marienstern), Panschwitz-Kuckau: Cistercian nuns (from 1248)
Marienthal, see also St. Marienthal and Somzig
Marienthron, see Nimbschen
Martinstal Priory (Kloster Martinstal), later Martinstal Charterhouse (Kartause Martinstal), Crimmitschau, Neukirchen: Augustinian Canons (1228–1478), Carthusian (1478–1526)
Meissen:
Abbey of the Holy Cross, Meissen (Kloster Heilig Kreuz, Meissen): Benedictine nuns (late 12th century - 1568)
Gymnasium Franziskaneum Meissen<!-–?= Sts Peter & Paul Friary––>
collegiate foundation, now the Evangelische Trinitätskirche
St. Afra's Priory, Meissen: Augustinian canons
Meissen Cathedral chapter
Mühlberg, see Marienstern
Mutzschen - Servites

N
Nimbschen Abbey (Kloster Nimbschen, Kloster Marienthron), near Grimma: Cistercian nuns (1243–1536/42)

O
Franciscan friary, Oschatz
Ostritz, see St. Marienthal
Oybin Abbey (Kloster Oybin) on Mount Oybin (Berg Oybin): Celestines (1369 – mid–16th century)

P
Pegau Abbey (Kloster Pegau or Kloster St Jakob, Pegau), Pegau: Benedictines
St. Henry's Priory, Pirna: Dominicans
Plauen:
Teutonic Knights
Dominican priory, Plauen

R
Radeburg:
Servite priory, Radeburg
Augustinian priory, Radeburg
Reichenbach Commandery, Reichenbach: Teutonic Knights
Remse Abbey, Remse: Benedictines
Riesa Abbey (Kloster Riesa), Riesa: Benedictines

S
St. Marienthal Abbey (Kloster St. Marienthal), Ostritz, Oberlausitz: Cistercian nuns (from 1234– )
Seusslitz Priory or St. Afra's Priory, Seusslitz (Kloster St. Afra, Seusslitz), Seusslitz in Nünchritz: Poor Clares (1268–1541)
Sitzenroda Abbey or Marienpforte Abbey, Sitzenroda (Kloster Sitzenroda, Kloster Marienpforte), Sitzenroda: Benedictines
Somzig Abbey or Marienthal Abbey (Kloster Somzig or Kloster Marienthal), Somzig: Benedictines
Staucha Abbey (Kloster Staucha), Staucha: Benedictines

T
Torgau:
Franciscan friary, Torgau
Torgau Abbey: Cistercian monks

W
Wechselburg Priory, formerly Wechselburg Abbey (Kloster Wechselburg): Benedictine monks (Benedictine monks (1168–1278); Teutonic Knights (1278–1570); refounded 1993 as a priory of Ettal Abbey)
Franciscan friary, Weinhübel (Zittauer Strasse)
Wurzen Abbey (Stift Wurzen), Wurzen: collegiate foundation

Z
Zelle Priory (Klösterlein Zelle), Aue (Sachsen): Augustinian Canons (1173–1524/25)
Franciscan friary, Zittau
Zwickau:
Cistercian abbey, Zwickau
Benedictine abbey, Zwickau
Franciscan friary, Zwickau

See also
List of Christian monasteries in Brandenburg
List of Christian monasteries in Mecklenburg-Vorpommern
List of Christian monasteries in North Rhine-Westphalia
List of Christian monasteries in Saxony-Anhalt
List of Christian monasteries in Schleswig-Holstein

Notes

Sources
Dresden-und-Sachsen.de 
Meinestadt.de:Sachsen 
HTW-Dresden.de: Klöster (with map) 

 
Saxony
Mon